Praemachilis is a genus of jumping bristletails in the family Machilidae. There is at least one described species in Praemachilis, P. excelsior.

References

Further reading

 
 
 
 
 

Archaeognatha
Articles created by Qbugbot